SkyTeam is one of the world's three major airline alliances. Founded in June 2000, SkyTeam was the last of the three alliances to be formed, the first two being Star Alliance and Oneworld, respectively. Its annual passenger count is 630 million (2019), the second largest of the three major alliances. , SkyTeam consists of 19 carriers from five continents and operates with the slogan "Caring more about you". It also operates a cargo alliance named SkyTeam Cargo, which partners ten carriers, all of them SkyTeam members. Its centralised management team, SkyTeam Central, is based at the World Trade Center Schiphol Airport on the grounds of Amsterdam Airport Schiphol in Haarlemmermeer, Netherlands. 

, SkyTeam flies to more than 1,150 destinations in more than 175 countries and operates more than 14,500 daily flights. The alliance and its members have 750 lounges worldwide.

Membership history

Formation and early years

On 22 June 2000, representatives of Delta Air Lines, Aeroméxico, Air France, and Korean Air held a meeting in New York to form a third airline alliance. These became the four founding carriers of SkyTeam. Upon its formation, SkyTeam would offer its customers a total of 6,402 daily flights to 451 destinations in 98 countries. In , the alliance established a cargo alliance, SkyTeam Cargo. The group's inaugural members were Aeromexpress, Air France Cargo, Delta Air Logistics and Korean Air Cargo. The following month, the newly established airline alliance announced its intentions to incorporate CSA Czech Airlines as the 5th member in April the following year.

The alliance saw the joining of CSA Czech Airlines on 25 March 2001; Alitalia entered SkyTeam on 27 July the same year, with its membership scheduled to become effective 1 November that year. On 30 September 2001, the alliance received KLM's application for membership, following the airline's plans to create a leading airline group with Air France. In 2003, Delta's subsidiary, Delta Express, was replaced by Song. That same year, SkyTeam also launched an improved website focused on providing passengers with more information, increased interactivity and other resources.

2004: First major expansion
On 24 May 2004, Aeroflot, the flag carrier and principal airline of Russia, signed a Memorandum of Understanding (MoU) with SkyTeam as it intended to become a full member. The event took place in Kremlin following the airline's application earlier in the year for membership. SkyTeam expressed that Aeroflot has not met the consortium's standards, but that the airline's large hub networks made it ideal for the alliance, and made up for its deficiencies.

On 28 August, China Southern Airlines, the largest carrier in the People's Republic of China, signed a preliminary agreement in Guangzhou in its bid to become a full member. In the presence of a number of Chinese and airline officials, Yan Zhiqing, the chairman of China Southern Airlines, said, "This agreement-signing event is an important step forward into the future for China Southern Airlines to adapt itself to the need of further reforms and opening to the international community, as it will strengthen the airline's international cooperation and global competitiveness."

On 13 September, Continental Airlines, KLM and Northwest Airlines joined the alliance. Their simultaneous entry was the largest expansion event in airline alliance history. As a result of the three new members, SkyTeam surpassed Oneworld to become the second largest airline alliance, serving more than 341 million customers with 14,320 daily flights to 658 destinations in 130 countries.

2005–2006
Even though member CSA Czech Airlines pledged to help Malév Hungarian Airlines become an associate member of the alliance (as opposed to a full member, an associate has no voting rights), Malév Hungarian Airlines opted to join the Oneworld airline alliance, signing a Memorandum of Understanding late in May. A few days later, SkyTeam announced four new associate members due to join by 2006, each one being "sponsored" by an existing member: Madrid-based Air Europa (sponsored by Air France), Panama-based Copa Airlines (sponsored and partly owned by Continental Airlines), Kenya Airways (sponsored and partly owned by KLM) and Romania's TAROM (sponsored by Alitalia). Every associate adopted a frequent-flyer program of a full member: Copa Airlines already used Continental OnePass; Kenya Airways and Air Europa used Air France–KLM Flying Blue.

Following a 23-month joining process since , Aeroflot joined on 14 April 2006. It was the first Russian airline to be associated with any airline alliance. Aeroflot has increased its operational standards, passing International Air Transport Association's (IATA) Operational Safety Audit (IOSA). Delta's subsidiary Song continued to operate as Delta Air Lines. In June, it was announced that Portugália would become the alliance's next associate member candidate. However, in November, rival airline and Star Alliance member TAP Air Portugal, purchased 99.81% of the airline, bringing a sudden end to its candidacy.

2007: Expansion
On 4 September 2007, Air Europa and Copa Airlines, and Kenya Airways became members of SkyTeam's Associate program, which was launched to serve airlines in strategic regions which intended to become affiliated with the alliance. China Southern Airlines joined SkyTeam on 15 November to become the 11th full member and the first carrier from China to join the alliance.

2008–2009: Departure of airlines and new initiatives

In , following an agreement between Continental Airlines and United Airlines, the former, as well as Copa Airlines, announced their intentions to move to the Star Alliance after Continental's final flight with SkyTeam on 24 October 2009. That day, as announced, Continental Airlines and Copa Airlines simultaneously left SkyTeam. Continental Airlines joined Star Alliance three days later; at the time, it was rumored that the switch was Continental Airlines' initial move in a United-Continental merger.

Also in 2009, Alitalia-Linee Aeree Italiane re-launched operations as the new Alitalia, and the alliance announced initiatives towards a centralized management based in Amsterdam. The consortium also named a new managing director, Marie-Joseph Malé, outlined a timeline for the opening of its co-located facilities at London Heathrow Airport, and unveiled a new special livery.

Tenth anniversary
To start off 2010, Northwest Airlines and Delta Air Lines operating certificates were officially combined on 1 January, while on 9 March, China Southern Airlines announced its plans to join SkyTeam Cargo. With membership expected to be granted in November the same year, the airline was to be the first Chinese carrier to join a global air cargo alliance. On 16 April China Eastern Airlines announced its intention to join SkyTeam, with the official joining ceremony initially expected to occur by mid-2011. The announcement came shortly after the airline's merger with Shanghai Airlines, a member of SkyTeam's rival, Star Alliance.

On 10 June, Vietnam Airlines became a full member following a joining ceremony held in Hanoi. The airline became the first SkyTeam carrier from Southeast Asia, where Star Alliance has a strong presence through Singapore Airlines and Thai Airways International. With an extra 20 unique destinations added to SkyTeam's route map, Vietnam Airlines helped to strengthen the alliance's foothold in the region.

On 22 June, the CEOs and chairmen of the 13 member airlines gathered in New York to celebrate the alliance's 10th anniversary. During its first decade of operation, the world's second largest airline alliance more than tripled its membership, doubled its flights and nearly doubled its destinations. On the same day, SkyTeam announced that it had renewed its membership program, thereby upgrading Air Europa, Kenya Airways and TAROM statuses from associate to full members. During the ceremony, the Board outlined its plans to recruit members from Latin America, South America and India. Three days later, TAROM officially became the 13th SkyTeam member. As a part of the celebration, SkyTeam offered reductions of round-the-world fares and other promotions. Following the 10th anniversary, SkyTeam intended to enhance customers' travel experience and deepen cooperation among its members to supplement the expansion into regions that are yet to have SkyTeam members.

During the year, Delta Air Lines offered  billion to Japan Airlines after the Asian airline filed for bankruptcy due to  billion debt, at the same time lobbying Oneworld's largest member in Asia to switch to SkyTeam. Delta, along with American Airlines, wanted Japan Airlines to be in their respective alliances to benefit from the U.S.–Japan Open Skies agreement. Eventually, Japan Airlines opted to remain at Oneworld, citing that the transfer to SkyTeam would confuse its passengers and may not gain antitrust immunity from U.S. regulators.

SkyTeam received its second application for full membership within a five-month time-span. China Airlines, Taiwan's flag carrier and largest airline, announced in mid- that it had formally started the joining process. Upon joining, the airline's route network supplemented those of China Southern Airlines and China Eastern Airlines, allowing cooperation among the three airlines. The following month, Aerolíneas Argentinas signed an agreement to officially start the process of becoming the first South American SkyTeam member. The airline was set to join in 2012.

On 1 November, Shanghai Airlines exited from Star Alliance to join SkyTeam in the future under its parent company, future SkyTeam member China Eastern Airlines. This bolstered SkyTeam's presence in the People's Republic of China and surrounding areas, making the SkyTeam the number one alliance in the region. Garuda Indonesia formally started its joining process on 23 November and was scheduled to be integrated by 2012. Upon joining, the airline became the second Southeast Asian airline to join SkyTeam, therefore challenging Star Alliance's dominance in the region through Thai Airways International and Singapore Airlines.

2011–2014: Second major expansion

On 10 January 2011, Saudi Arabian Airlines signed an agreement to join SkyTeam in 2012. On 28 February the same year, Middle East Airlines agreed to join the alliance. Member airlines Delta and Air France–KLM appointed Goldman Sachs in late  to advise them on a potential bid for Sir Richard Branson's 51% stake in Virgin Atlantic, which could lead to the airline joining SkyTeam and would sharply increase the alliance's footprint in London. Rivals Star Alliance and Etihad Airlines were also investigating competing options with regard to Virgin Atlantic. China Eastern Airlines joined the alliance on 21 June 2011, along with its subsidiary, Shanghai Airlines, to become the 14th member. Later in 2011, on 28 September, China Airlines joined the alliance. In  the same year, Xiamen Airlines committed to be incorporated as a full member by the end of 2012, with their entry supported by China Southern Airlines.

On 29 May 2012, Saudi Arabian Airlines became both the first carrier in joining the alliance in 2012 and the first one based in the Middle East, which brought the total members to 16. The same day of its incorporation, Saudi Arabian Airlines was renamed to Saudia. Middle East Airlines became the 17th member of the alliance a month later, following its incorporation on 28 June 2012. On 29 August 2012, Aerolíneas Argentinas became the first South American and the second Latin American airline in joining the alliance, bringing the number of members to 18. Following its incorporation on 21 November 2012, Xiamen Airlines became the fourth member in Mainland China, with the overall number of members in the alliance rising to 19. In late , the Russian newspaper Kommersant published an article that mentions that Aeroflot was considering leaving the alliance over disagreements with Delta on the pricing on some routes to North America. The report also mentioned that the Russian carrier was considering joining Star Alliance.

Garuda Indonesia became the 20th member of the alliance on 5 March 2014. Garuda initially expected to gain SkyTeam membership in 2012, but the joining process took  months to be completed.

2015–present: Stability 
In November 2018, China Southern Airlines announced that it would leave the alliance effective .

On 4 November 2019, the International Airlines Group announced it was buying Air Europa and that the airline would leave SkyTeam if the deal succeeds. The COVID-19 pandemic and antitrust concerns derailed the acquisition, though negotiations have resumed since March 2022. In February 2023, the negotiations were completed and IAG agreed to buy Air Europa for €400 million.

On 15 October 2021, Alitalia ceased operations therefore departing the alliance. Its successor airline, ITA Airways, joined SkyTeam on 29 October 2021.

In February 2022, both Delta and KLM announced the suspension of their code sharing agreements with Aeroflot in connection with the 2022 Russian invasion of Ukraine. Subsequently, on 27 April, Skyteam and Aeroflot announced that Aeroflot's membership with the alliance has been suspended. 

On 2 March 2023, Virgin Atlantic officially joined the alliance, making it the 19th member while Aeroflot remained suspended.

Member airlines

Full members and their member affiliates

, the following airlines are members of SkyTeam:

Suspended members and member affiliates

Former members and member affiliates

Former member airlines and their affiliates

Former affiliate members of current full members

Former associate members

SkyTeam Cargo

SkyTeam Cargo is the cargo division of SkyTeam. , the cargo alliance comprised twelve members from the passenger alliance: Aeroflot Cargo, Aeroméxico Cargo, Air France Cargo, Alitalia Cargo, China Airlines Cargo, China Cargo Airlines, Czech Airlines Cargo, Delta Cargo, KLM Cargo, Korean Air Cargo and Saudia Cargo. Saudia Cargo joined the alliance on 15 April 2019.

Livery and logo
SkyTeam launched a special livery in 2009, coinciding with the alliance's  anniversary, with Delta Air Lines being the first airline to paint one of its aircraft with these colours. The livery consisted of an all-metallic silver fuselage and a dark blue empennage with SkyTeam's logo on it. The alliance emblem is painted on both sides of the fuselage. Aircraft painted in an airline's regular livery have the SkyTeam logo between the cockpit and the first set of cabin doors. , the SkyTeam livery is worn by  aircraft.

See also
 Oneworld
 Star Alliance

Notes

References

External links
 
 SkyTeam Cargo

 
Airline alliances
2000 establishments in the Netherlands
Airlines established in 2000
Organizations established in 2000
2000 in aviation
Organisations based in North Holland
Haarlemmermeer